Pernille Rosendahl (born 22 March 1972) is a Danish singer, who besides her solo career was lead singer of the Danish band Swan Lee and now is lead vocalist for the Danish rock band The Storm.

Rosendahl was born in Aalborg and started music at an early age. In 1985, she formed a reggae band with drummer Emil Jørgensen, named Rocka. She also sang in a choir between 1991 and 1994. In 1995, she recorded an album in London with producer Tim Simenon, but the album was never released.

In Swan Lee

In 1996 she formed a band with her then-boyfriend Tim Christensen, her Rocka band partner Emil Jørgensen, and guitarist Jonas Struck. Christensen left the band in 1999.

After the departure of Christensen, the remaining trio (Rosendahl, Jørgensen and Struck) continued playing together and renamed their band as Swan Lee. An entire album was recorded with the newly signed Cannibal Records, but the label never released because of musical differences with the label's director Kim Hyttel, followed by lawsuits. Other record companies rejected them seeing a potential only in Rosendahl.

The band finally decided to establish their own record label, named GoGo Records, and in February 2001 released their debut album Enter. The album sold 20,000 copies and contained, the single "Tomorrow Never Dies", written in collaboration with Tim Christensen. In 2004, the band had another album, the self-titled Swan Lee. Swan Lee disbanded in September 2005.

In The Storm

In late summer 2007, she and husband Johan Wohlert formed the rock band The Storm, after he left his former band Mew. The Storm has released three albums Where the Storm Meets the Ground in 2008, Black Luck in 2009, and Rebel Against Yourself in 2011.

Other appearances
Rosendahl has recorded on albums with Puddu Varano in 2001, Claus Hempler in 2004
In 2002 she appeared in Cheshire on the song "You & I" which was later remixed by Trentemoller.
In 2006, she sang on the soundtrack for the film Supervoksen in a cover version of D-A-D's hit  "Laugh 'n' a Half". The film was directed by her sister Christina Rosendahl.
In 2006, her band Swan Lee's song Tomorrow Never Dies was featured in Danish IO Interactive's videogame Hitman: Blood Money.
In 2008 she starred in the song "Mary Ann's Place" by the Danish metal band Volbeat on their album Guitar Gangsters & Cadillac Blood.
She became a judge in the Danish X Factor in season 3 in 2010 and season 4 in 2011. In season 3, she mentored the eventual winner Thomas Ring Petersen during the final on 27 March 2010 also writing the winner's song "My Dream"
 She was also singing the Danish National song in the boxing match between Mikkel Kessler and Mehdi Bouadla.

Personal life
She was married to Johan Wohlert, who rejoined the alternative music band Mew in 2014. They have a son named Tristan born in June 2006. She is also the sister of the Danish film director Christina Rosendahl.

Discography

Albums
Solo
1997: Dream Away
2016: Dark Bird

As part of Swan Lee
2001: Enter
2004: Swan Lee
2013: The Garden

As part of The Storm
2008: Where the Storm Meets the Ground
2009: Black Luck
2011: Rebel Against Yourself

As part of DR Pigekoret
2018: Din Danske Sang

References

1972 births
Living people
Danish songwriters
English-language singers from Denmark
21st-century Danish women  singers
People from Aalborg